Lions Gate Hospital (LGH) is a 268-bed medical facility located in North Vancouver, British Columbia. The hospital is part of and operated by Vancouver Coastal Health (VCH), the regional health authority for the North Shore.

Overview
The hospital formally opened on 22 April 1961. 
Opened in 2014, the Greta and Robert H.N. Ho Psychiatry and Education Centre (HOpe Centre) provides mental health services both at the hospital and in outpatient clinics. It is the fourth busiest hospital in Vancouver, and one of only five neurosurgery centres in British Columbia proper.

References

External links 

 Lion Gate Hospital Foundation 

Hospitals in British Columbia
North Vancouver (city)
North Vancouver, British Columbia articles